Tejar may refer to:

 El Tejar, Chimaltenango, a municipality in the Chimaltenango department of Guatemala
 El Tejar del Guarco, or Tejar de El Guarco, the capital city of the El Guarco Canton, in the province of Cartago in Costa Rica
 Cimanes del Tejar, a municipality in the province of León, Castile and León, Spain